Arnau Bassa was a Catalan painter of the 14th century.

He was the son and disciple of painter Ferrer Bassa, with whom he collaborated on numerous works. He introduced in his style influences of the pre-Avignonese school, but later he moved to a more Italianizing Gothic painting, of which he became one of the main exponents in Catalonia, Spain.

Among his works is documented an altarpiece for the shoemakers guild of Barcelona (11 December 1346), destined to the city's cathedral, later moved to the Basilica of Santa Maria in Manresa. In 1347, together with his father, he executed the retablo of St. James for the Monastery of Jonqueres, now in the Diocesan Museum of Barcelona. He also took part in the retablo of the Royal Palace of La Almudaina in  Palma de Mallorca (now in the National Museum of Ancient Art in Lisbon), which was later finished by the workshop of Ramón Destorrents, after both Arnau and Ferrer had died of plague in 1348.

Sources

1348 deaths
Painters from Catalonia
14th-century Spanish painters
Spanish male painters
14th-century deaths from plague (disease)
Year of birth unknown
Medieval Catalan artists
14th-century Catalan people